Princess Lakshmi Rajya Lakshmi Devi (August 11, 1895 - September 4, 1954) was the eldest daughter of King Prithvi of Nepal. As the eldest daughter of King Prithvi, she was made the crown princess and was heiress to the throne until her younger brother, Tribhuvan was born.

Princess Lakshmi was married to Field Marshal Kaiser Shamsher Jang Bahadur Rana, a son of Prime Minister Chandra Shamsher Rana. The marriage took place at the Narayanhity Royal Palace. The Rana prime ministers, at that time, had most of the political leadership and dominance. They wanted to strengthen their rule and dominance, and wanted heirs of the Ranas to sit in the throne of Nepal; they arranged marriages between members of the Rana family and members of the royal family. King Prithvi had several daughters but no sons, and Chandra Shamsher then passed a new regulation on the law of succession, making it possible for a princess to accede to the throne. Princess Lakshmi thus became Crown Princess Lakshmi and was her father's heiress. However, Princess Lakshmi's younger brother Tribhuvan was born only five years before King Prithvi's death. As such, as King Prithvi's male heir, Tribhuvan acceded to the throne after his father died in 1911.

Princess Lakshmi died in 1954.

Honours

National Honours 
 Royal Jubilee Medal (11 December 1936).

The Lakshmi Blood Bank was established in 1966 in her honour.

References 

Nepalese princesses
Nepalese royalty
1895 births
1954 deaths
20th-century Nepalese nobility
19th-century Nepalese nobility
Nepalese Hindus